Jenny Caroline Marx Longuet  (1 May 1844 – 11 January 1883) was the eldest daughter of Jenny von Westphalen Marx and Karl Marx. Briefly a political journalist writing under the pen name J. Williams, Longuet taught language classes and had a family of five sons and a daughter before her death to cancer at the age of 38.

Biography

Early years

Jenny Caroline Marx, known to family and close friends as "Jennychen" to distinguish her from her mother, was born in Paris on 1 May 1844, the oldest daughter of Karl Marx and Jenny von Westphalen Marx. She was a fragile child but was nevertheless the first of the Marx children to survive childhood.

In 1868, at the age of 24, she accepted a position as a French language teacher in order to help her parents financially. She also contributed a number of articles to the socialist press, in 1870 writing under the pen name "J. Williams" on the treatment of the Irish political prisoners by the British government.

She met her future husband, the French journalist and radical political activist Charles Longuet in 1871. The pair became engaged in March 1872 and were married on 10 October the same year in a civil ceremony at St Pancras registry office, she taking the name Jenny Longuet.

As with her parents, the young couple faced economic hardship in their earliest years. They moved to Oxford soon after their marriage, hoping that Charles could find work as a teacher, but he was unable to do so. Jenny earned a meagre income for the pair working as a private tutor, giving lessons in French, German, and singing.

The couple's financial lives became more stable in 1874, when Jenny and Charles found work as teachers, with Jenny holding a position as a German teacher at the St Clement Danes School. The minimal salary she earned at the school was supplemented by giving private lessons. Her husband obtained a position teaching French at King's College, together making enough to maintain a small house in London.

Jenny Longuet was pregnant in almost every year of her married life. She gave birth to a first son in September 1873, but the child died the following summer of diarrhea. A second son, Jean Laurent Frederick "Johnny" Longuet (1876–1938) fared better, surviving to eventually become a leader of the Socialist Party of France.

A third son, born in 1878, mentally challenged and sickly, died at the age of 5, while a fourth, Edgar "Wolf" Longuet (1879–1950) lived a full life, becoming a medical doctor as well as an activist in the French Socialist Party.

Return to France
A political amnesty granted by the government of France in July 1880 allowed Charles Longuet the opportunity to return to his native country and he was quick to return, taking a position as an editor of La Justice, a radical daily newspaper founded by Georges Clemenceau. By this time, however, Jenny had begun to suffer from cancer and she for a time remained in London with her three sons, to be near her aging parents.

In February 1881 Jenny and the boys moved to France to join her husband. The family settled in the town of Argenteuil, near Paris, where they were regularly visited by the boys' doting grandfather Karl Marx.

Despite her ill health, Jenny delivered another son, Marcel Longuet (1881-1949) who later worked as a journalist, including for the Parisian newspaper L'Aurore. A final child, a daughter also named Jenny Longuet, was born in September 1882 and lived until 1952.

Death and legacy
Just four months after the birth of her daughter, Longuet died at Argenteuil on 11 January 1883, at the age of 38, probably from cancer of the bladder, a condition which had afflicted her for some time. Her father was too ill to attend the funeral in France; he died two months later.

Footnotes

External links

 Jenny Longuet papers at IISG
 Jenny Longuet archive at Marxists Internet Archive

1844 births
1883 deaths
People from Paris
French Marxists
French activists
French women activists
Women Marxists
People educated at South Hampstead High School
French people of German-Jewish descent
French people of Scottish descent
Karl Marx
Deaths from bladder cancer
Deaths from cancer in France
German emigrants to France
19th-century pseudonymous writers
Pseudonymous women writers